Banshi Lal Khatik is an Indian politician and a Member of the Legislative Assembly of India. He represents the Rajsamand (SC) constituency of Rajasthan and is a member of the Bhartiya Janata Party political party.

Early life and education 
Banshi Lal Khatik was born in a Hindu Khatik family in Lawa sardagargh, Rajasthan.

Political career 
Banshi Lal has been a MLA for one term. Before making debut in politics he was a social activist in Rashtriya Swayamsevak Sangh. He represented the Rajsamand constituency and is a member of the Bhartiya Janata Party political party. He defeated Banshi Lal Gahlot (INC) with total votes 63294 (55.91%)

References

Bharatiya Janata Party politicians from Rajasthan
Living people
1957 births